The 1972 Austrian Grand Prix was a Formula One motor race held at Österreichring on 13 August 1972. It was race 9 of 12 in both the 1972 World Championship of Drivers and the 1972 International Cup for Formula One Manufacturers. The 54-lap race was won by Lotus driver Emerson Fittipaldi after he started from pole position. Denny Hulme finished second for the McLaren team and his teammate Peter Revson came in third.

Qualifying

Qualifying classification

Race

Classification

Championship standings after the race

Drivers' Championship standings

Constructors' Championship standings

Note: Only the top five positions are included for both sets of standings.

References

Austrian Grand Prix
Grand Prix
1972
Austrian Grand Prix